is a railway station in Konohana-ku, Osaka, Osaka Prefecture, Japan.  There were station signs with the spelling "Denpō" from the opening until December 2008, then they were replaced the new ones with the spelling "Dempō" in February 2009.

Lines
Hanshin Electric Railway
Hanshin Namba Line

Layout

Adjacent stations

|-
!colspan=5|Hanshin Railway

All rapid express trains pass Chidoribashi, Dempo, Fuku, Dekijima, and Daimotsu every day from March 20, 2012, and suburban semi-express trains run to Amagasaki instead.

References

Konohana-ku, Osaka
Railway stations in Osaka
Stations of Hanshin Electric Railway
Railway stations in Japan opened in 1924